Elizaveta Sergeyevna Nazarenkova (born 27 August 1995) is a retired Russian individual rhythmic gymnast who competed for Uzbekistan. She is a two-time all-around silver medalist at the Asian Championships.

Career 
Born in a family of sportsmen. Nazarenkova's father is a master of sports in swimming, and her mother has the same title in rhythmic gymnastics. At first, Elizaveta trained under the guidance of her mother in Murmansk Sports School of Olympic Reserve for Children and Youth-13 but was later invited to train under the Russian training center in Novogorsk

In 2013, Nazarenkova won the bronze medal in hoop at the 2013 World Games in Cali, Colombia. She competed in her first World Cup event at the 2014 Debrecen World Cup and won bronze in the all-around and clubs, a silver in ribbon.

Competing for Uzbekistan 
In May 2014, Nazarenkova switched nationality and will compete for Uzbekistan. On 22–24 May, Nazarenkova competed at the 2014 Tashkent World Cup where she finished 8th in all-around. She won her first World Cup medal representing Uzbekistan winning a bronze medal in clubs final (tied with Azerbaijan's Marina Durunda). Nazarenkova then competed at the 2014 Minsk World Cup and finished 16th in all-around. On 4–6 July, Nazarenkova competed at the Izmir Tournament Cup and won the all-around bronze medal behind Maria Titova, In event finals, Nazarenkova won gold in clubs, silver in ribbon and bronze in hoop. On 8–10 August, Nazarenkova competed at the 2014 Sofia World Cup finishing 8th in all-around with a total of 67.950 points, she qualified to 3 event finals, finishing 5th (clubs, ball) and 7th in ribbon behind Varvara Filiou. On 5–7 September, Nazarenkova competed at the 2014 World Cup Final in Kazan, finishing 8th in all-around, she qualified to 3 event finals. On 22–28 September, Nazarenkova (along with teammates Djamila Rakhmatova and Anastasiya Serdyukova) represented Uzbekistan at the 2014 World Championships where Team Uzbekistan finished in 8th place. She finished 15th in the all-around finals with a total of 65.524 points.

In 2015, Nazarenkova began the season competing at the 2015 Moscow Grand Prix finishing 19th in the all-around. On 21–22 March, Nazarenkova competed at the 2015 Thiais Grand Prix finishing 6th in the all-around. She then competed at the 2015 Bucharest World Cup and finished 8th in the all-around. On 10–12 April, Nazarenkova finished 9th in the all-around at the 2015 Pesaro World Cup and qualified to 2 event finals. On 22–24 May, Nazarenkova competed at the 2015 Tashkent World Cup finishing 7th in the all-around. She qualified to 2 apparatus finals. Nazarenkova finished 7th in all-around at the 2015 Grand Prix Berlin with a total of 70.450 points and qualified to 3 event finals. Nazarenkova won the all-around silver at the 2015 Asian Championships behind Korean Son Yeon-Jae, in apparatus finals she won gold in clubs and silver in ball. Nazarenkova finished 7th in all-around at the 2015 Summer Universiade and qualified to 3 event finals. In August, Nazarenkova competed at the 2015 Budapest World Cup finishing 9th in all-around, she qualified to all 4 apparatus finals, placing 5th in ribbon, 6th in clubs, ball and 8th in hoop. Nazarenkova then finished 12th in the all-around at the 2015 Sofia World Cup behind Israeli Victoria Veinberg Filanovsky. At the 2015 World Cup Final in Kazan, Nazarenkova finished 11th in the all-around and qualified to ball finals. On 9–13 September, Nazarenkova (together with teammates Anastasiya Serdyukova and Anora Davlyatova) competed at the 2015 World Championships in Stuttgart were Team Uzbekistan finished 8th. Nazarenkova qualified in the All-around finals finishing in 16th place with a total of 69.282 points.

In 2016, Nazarenkova suffered a leg injury early in the season. On 1–3 April, she returned to competition at the 2016 Pesaro World Cup where she finished 21st in the all-around. On 21–22 April, Nazarenkova competed at the 2016 Gymnastics Olympic Test Event held in Rio de Janeiro however she finished a disappointing 11th and did not qualify in top 8 highest score for non qualified gymnasts, teammate Anastasiya Serdyukova who finished 5th won the Olympics license for the 2016 Rio Olympics Nazarenkova repeated as silver medalist in the all-around (All-around: 71.450 points) at the 2016 Asian Championships held in Tashkent. On 13–15 May, Nazarenkova competed at the 2016 Tashkent World Cup finishing 8th in the all-around, she qualified to 3 apparatus finals and won bronze in clubs.

Routine music information

References

External links
 
 
 

1995 births
Living people
Uzbekistani rhythmic gymnasts
Russian rhythmic gymnasts
People from Murmansk
World Games bronze medalists
Competitors at the 2013 World Games
Sportspeople from Murmansk Oblast